"Non mi avete fatto niente" (English: "You haven't done anything to me") is a song performed by Italian singers Ermal Meta and Fabrizio Moro. The song was released as a digital download on 7 February 2018 as the lead single from the respective albums by each artist: Non abbiamo armi and Parole rumori e anni. It won the Sanremo Music Festival 2018 and represented Italy in the Eurovision Song Contest 2018 in Lisbon, Portugal. On 30 March 2018, the shortened version for Eurovision was released on spotify.

In February 2019, the song received a nomination for the Voices for Freedom Award, voted by the Italian division of Amnesty International for the best song with a social message.

Composition 
The song was written by both singer-songwriters together with Andrea Febo. The lyrics deal with wars across the world and terrorist attacks in Europe and the Middle East: the cities of London, Paris, Nice, Cairo and Barcelona are cited in the lyrics. The song was written consequently to the Manchester Arena bombing that happened after an Ariana Grande concert in May 2017.

The chorus of the song is cited from a previous song written by Febo (third author of "Non mi avete fatto niente"), titled "Silenzio" and submitted to the Newcomers' section of the Sanremo Music Festival 2016 performed by Ambra Calvani and Gabriele De Pascali.

Eurovision Song Contest

Meta and Moro were announced to be taking part in the Sanremo Music Festival 2018 with the song "Non mi avete fatto niente" on 16 December 2017. They competed during the show's first night on 6 February 2018, placing first after winning the televote and public opinion jury and placing second with the press jury. The song competed again during the third night on 8 February, and placed first yet again, receiving top marks from the televote, and placing second and third with the public opinion jury and press jury, respectively. The song later competed in the final on 10 February, and advanced to the superfinal along with the songs by Annalisa and Lo Stato Sociale. They went on to win the competition after receiving 44.66% of the overall vote. Shortly after, it was confirmed that Meta and Moro had accepted the invitation to represent Italy at the Eurovision Song Contest 2018 with the song "Non mi avete fatto niente".

As Italy is a member of the "Big Five", the song automatically advanced to the final, held on 12 May 2018 in Lisbon, Portugal. The song reached fifth place.

Track listing

Charts

Release history

See also
 List of anti-war songs

References

2018 songs
Anti-war songs
Eurovision songs of 2018
Eurovision songs of Italy
Sony Music singles
Sanremo Music Festival songs